The David B. Cole Observatory is an educational astronomical observatory owned and operated by Barnstable High School. It is named after David Cole, the longtime trustee of the trust fund of Enoch Cobb. The observatory itself houses one telescope, while there are mounts outside the building for four more telescopes. The observatory is also located within the grounds of the high school, thus allowing for more access to the building for its students.

See also
List of astronomical observatories

References

Astronomical observatories in Massachusetts
Buildings and structures in Barnstable, Massachusetts